
This is a list of games for the Amiga line of personal computers organised alphabetically by name. See Lists of video games for related lists.

This list has been split into multiple pages. It contains over 3000 games. Please use the Table of Contents to browse it.

List of Amiga games A through H

List of Amiga games I through O

List of Amiga games P through Z

Sources

 Hall Of Light
 Lemon Amiga
 Game Browser: Amiga at MobyGames

Amiga games